Navarretia sinistra (formerly Gilia sinistra) is a species of flowering plant in the phlox family known by the common name Alva Day's pincushionplant.

Description       
Navarretia sinistra produces a branching, leafy stem coated in knobby glands. The leaves are sometimes deeply cut or lobed.

The inflorescence produces generally 2 or 3 flowers on very thin stalks. Each flower has a pouchlike calyx of sepals which are ribbed with reddish membranous tissue between. The tubular flower has a pink corolla and a red-streaked yellow throat. The protruding stamens are tipped with blue anthers.

The bloom period is June to August.

Distribution and habitat
The plant is endemic to the western United States, within northern California, Nevada, and Oregon.

It is native to mountain chaparral, sagebrush scrub, yellow pine forest, red fir forest, and lodgepole forest habitats, often on volcanic or serpentine soils.

References

External links
Calflora Database:  Navarretia sinistra (Alva day's pincushionplant)
Jepson Manual eFlora (TJM2) treatment of Navarretia sinistra
UC CalPhotos gallery − Navarretia sinistra

sinistra
Flora of California
Flora of Nevada
Flora of Oregon
Flora of the Cascade Range
Flora of the Great Basin
Flora of the Klamath Mountains
Natural history of the California chaparral and woodlands
Endemic flora of the United States
Flora without expected TNC conservation status